Richard Thomas Healey (born March 12, 1938) is a Canadian former professional ice hockey defenceman who played one game in the National Hockey League with the Detroit Red Wings during the 1960–61 season, on January 4, 1961 against the Toronto Maple Leafs. The rest of his career, which lasted from 1959 to 1970, was spent in various minor leagues.

Career statistics

Regular season and playoffs

See also
 List of players who played only one game in the NHL

External links
 

1938 births
Living people
Canadian ice hockey defencemen
Detroit Red Wings players
Edmonton Flyers (WHL) players
Edmonton Oil Kings (WCHL) players
Hershey Bears players
Sault Thunderbirds players
Ice hockey people from Vancouver
Sudbury Wolves (EPHL) players